The Gazette  is the daily newspaper of Janesville, Wisconsin. The newspaper is owned by Adams Publishing Group. The newspaper has a print circulation of 14,000 customers. It also runs a news website under the name GazetteXtra.

History
The Gazette was established in 1845. It was sold to Adams Publishing Group in 2019; prior to then, it had been owned by the Bliss family for 136 years. While it had previously published every day of the week, the newspaper suspended its Saturday and Sunday editions in June 2020 due to the financial impact of the COVID-19 pandemic.

References

External links
GazetteXtra

Janesville, Wisconsin
Newspapers published in Wisconsin
1845 establishments in Wisconsin Territory
Publications established in 1845